Cravo Norte Airport  is an airport serving the Casanare River town of Cravo Norte in the Arauca Department of Colombia.

The runway has an additional  of overrun on the northeast end.

See also

Transport in Colombia
List of airports in Colombia

References

External links
OpenStreetMap - Cravo Norte
OurAirports - Cravo Norte
SkyVector - Cravo Norte
FallingRain - Cravo Norte Airport

Airports in Colombia